The 13th National Spelling Bee was held in Washington, D.C. at the National Museum on May 25, 1937, and sponsored by the Louisville, Kentucky Courier-Journal. Scripps-Howard would not sponsor the Bee until 1941.

Sixteen spellers participated in the competition, held in the auditorium of the National Museum. The winner was 14-year-old Waneeta Beckley of Kentucky, correctly spelling the word promiscuous. Second place went to Betty Grunstra, age 12 of New Jersey, who misspelled plebeian. Third place went to 14-year-old Angelo Mangieri from Jersey City, New Jersey, the first blind person to reach the finals.

Beckley won $500, Grunstra took home $300, and Mangieri received $100.

See also
List of Scripps National Spelling Bee champions

References

Scripps National Spelling Bee competitions
1937 in education
1937 awards
Scripps
May 1937 events